Sajith Fernando (born 27 September 1972) is a Sri Lankan former first-class cricketer who played 193 matches between 1993 and 2012, scoring more than 10,000 runs. He is a former student of St. Anthony's College, Kandy. 

On 15 September 2017, Fernando was appointed as one of the selectors for selection committee for the Sri Lanka national cricket team.

References

External links
 

1972 births
Living people
Sri Lankan cricketers
Colts Cricket Club cricketers
Kandurata cricketers
Tamil Union Cricket and Athletic Club cricketers
Sportspeople from Kandy
Sri Lankan cricket coaches